Sixteen ships of the French Navy have borne the name Diligente ("Diligent"):

Ships named Diligente 
 , a 14-gun frigate 
 , a light frigate 
 , a 20-gun frigate 
 , a 6-gun corvette 
 , a fluyt 
 , a 4-gun tartane 
 , a sloop 
 , a 10-gun corvette 
 , a 32-gun frigate 
 , a Naïade-class brig 
 , a corvette, lead ship of her class 
 , a gunboat 
 , a corvette 
 , a sloop 
 , a gunboat, lead ship of her class 
 , a Friponne-class minesweeper

See also 
 French ship Diligent

Notes and references
Notes

References

Bibliography
 
 

French Navy ship names